The 1943 WANFL season was the 59th season of the Western Australian National Football League.

Ladder

Finals

First semi-final

Second semi-final

Preliminary final

Grand Final

References

External links
Season results
Western Australian National Football League (WANFL), 1943

West Australian Football League seasons
WANFL